James S. Mace was a member of the Wisconsin State Assembly.

Biography
Mace was born in Cleveland, Ohio. He eventually became a switchman and switch foreman on the Great Northern Railway and settled in Superior, Wisconsin.

Political career
Mace was a member of the Assembly from 1939 to 1940. Additionally, he was a member of the Douglas County, Wisconsin Board. He was a member of the Wisconsin Progressive Party.

References

Politicians from Cleveland
Politicians from Superior, Wisconsin
County supervisors in Wisconsin
Members of the Wisconsin State Assembly
Wisconsin Progressives (1924)
20th-century American politicians
Year of birth missing
Year of death missing